Warrant Officer  was a member of the Imperial Japanese Navy's Zero fighter aces who fought the Battle of Solomon Islands in October 1942 – June 1943. He is best known as the only escort fighter pilot of the Yamamoto mission to have survived the war.

Biography
Born on Hokkaidō, he moved with his family at his age of two and grew up at Tomarioru prairie in Karafuto (Sakhalin). He enlisted in the Imperial Japanese Navy (IJN) at January 10, 1940 as an aircraft mechanic, then selected as a Hei-shu Hiko Yoka Renshu Sei (C-class Flight Reserve Trainee), a course was for seamen and naval non-commissioned officers already in the navy. He completed his pilot training course in March 1942. He then became a Flyer / 1st Class fighter pilot of 6th Kokutai at Kisarazu Air Base. Yanagiya arrived at Rabaul on October 7, 1942 as a member of 6th Kokutai, which was under the command of the 26th Air Flotilla in South East Division Air Fleet (including the 11th Air Fleet). The group was renamed the 204th Kokutai the following month. He was one of the escort fighter pilots of the Fleet Admiral Yamamoto's visit to Ballale Base on April 18, 1943. After Yamamoto's death, he was injured and lost his right hand on a subsequent mission to Russell Islands, near Guadalcanal, in June 1943, which subsequently caused him to be sent back to the home islands for treatment and recovery.

The Six Escort Fighter Pilots after the Incident
Yanagiya and his fellow pilots were neither accused nor criticized. Yanagiya was promoted to Petty Officer 2nd Class on May 1 as scheduled previously. The 204th Air Group commander and his staff officers knew that it was hard to save two Type 1 Land based attackers from sixteen Allied fighters engaging with only six escort fighters. The six pilots, however, thought themselves responsible for the incident so seriously that they charged themselves to shoot down as many Allied airplanes as possible.

On June 7, 1943, the 204th Air Group at Buin base planned an operation to bomb Allied Russell Islands airfield with 81 fighters. Twelve Zeros, armed with firebombs beneath each wing, in 3 sets of “Lotte” formations approached at an altitude of 8000 m, while other Zero groups escorted. The reinforced 50 Allied fighters adopted new formation tactics with 10 fighters in 1 group each. A furious battle resulted between the Zeros and the 50 Allied fighters. Over the airfield, Yanagiya's group dived from 8,000 m (26,000 ft) to 6,000 m (20,000 ft), released their firebombs then pulled up.

Yanagiya was caught in the tail position by two F4Fs and received bursts of gunfire. The majority of his right hand had been shot off and lost with the top of the control stick with only his little finger remaining attached to his wrist. His right leg had been shot and was bleeding. He thereafter controlled the plane with his left hand and flew back to IJN Munda airstrip at New Georgia Island.  During the return flight, with his right leather boot filling with blood from his leg wound and near fainting from the blood loss, he repeatedly shouted in a loud voice to keep himself awake in the cockpit. He was unable to operate levers on the starboard side of the cockpit to unload flaps or landing gears yet he managed to safely make a slide landing into the airstrip. Imperial Japanese Marine soldiers took him out of the cockpit and a doctor operated immediately, cutting the remainder of his right hand off at the wrist.

Chief Petty Officer Yoshimi Hidaka and Petty Officer 1st Class Yasushi Okazaki both died in the action. Petty Officer 2nd Class Kameji Yamane was missing in the action. Petty Officer 2nd Class Kenji Yanagiya lost his right hand and was hospitalized. These four pilots all flew Zero fighters armed with heavy bombs beneath each wing on the mission that day. They couldn't fight with all their strength. The Zeros of the 204th Air Group claimed 13 Allied aircraft shot down that day.

On June 16, a Japanese scout aircraft found big group of Allied transports off shore Lunga point, Guadalcanal. The 204th Air Group at Buin base all attacked in full power. The 204th Air Group fighter squadron leader Lieutenant Zenjiro Miyano and Lieutenant (JG) Morisaki died in the action.

On July 1, the remaining 204th Air Group struck the Allied anchorage at Rendova Island. Chief Petty Officer Toyomitsu Tsujinoue was on the duty to escort dive-bombers and missing in the action.

Young Flyer 1st Class Shoichi Sugita kept fighting wildly and survived the Battle of Solomon Islands in 1943, but he was killed in action at the age of 20 in April 1945. In August 1943, he was shot down in flames and bailed out. He was seriously injured and returned homeland Japan alive. In March 1944, Petty Officer 2nd Class Sugita came back as a member of the 263rd Air Group at Guam. But the units were seriously damaged by three days of sorties. In June, the 263rd Air Group members were merged with the 201st Air Group (2nd generation) in the Philippines, which was reorganized as the first Kamikaze Corps by the 1st Air Fleet (2nd generation) Commander in Chief, Vice Admiral Takijiro Onishi. Many younger aviators had been ordered to fly Kamikaze sorties daily. Sugita finally threatened the commander of the 201st Air Group, Captain Sakae Yamamoto with his gun to get an order of Kamikaze sorties for him first. He was ordered to come back to Japan again. In January 1945, Petty Officer 1st Class Sugita joined the 301st fighting squadron of the 343rd Air Group. He was finally shot down and killed in action while he flew a Shidenkai (Allied codename George) taking off from Kanoya Airfield in Kyūshū, Japan in April 1945.

Five out of the six fighter pilots died and one was injured.

Captain Ushie Sugimoto died in action on June 12, 1945 in the Philippines. Sugimoto was the commander in chief of the 26th Air Flotilla. He stayed with his ground members and mechanics of the air units to fight as infantry left without support. His flock was reportedly holding a position somewhere in Mount Pinatubo, Philippines, while all chief officers and most commissioned officers of the 1st Air Fleet's air units had already withdrawn to Taiwan. The 26th Air Flotilla was under the command of the 1st Air Fleet, but the units lost all aircraft Kamikaze sorties by January 1945.

Back on October 25, 1944, Vice Admiral Onishi had called all commanders of his Air Flotillas to a mid-night meeting, at IJN Clark Air Base in Philippine. The Commander in Chief of the 1st Air Fleet, Vice Admiral Onishi, had conferred with his high-ranking officials for ideas on how to repel the Allied forces from the Philippines in a tangible way, but there had been few ideas. Onishi had then decided to expand his operation plan "Kamikaze" to all his air units, and had warned them if there were any officers who opposed "Kamikaze" attacks, they should be executed.

The Japanese were prohibited to surrender by their Military code. Few survivors testified that Captain Sugimoto died from starvation, and his last words were, "Eat my flesh and blood, you must survive."

Yanagiya survived the war. He thought the result of the Yamamoto mission was his shame, not the thing to be proud of. He kept silent until a non-fiction writer, Akira Yoshimura interviewed him 30 years later in mid-1970s.

Yanagiya died on Feb. 29, 2008, at age of 88.

His record 
He was credited with 8 victories. In addition, he was credited with 18 shared victories, where fighter pilots were fully credited for 'shared' victories (i.e., if pilots shot down one aircraft, all pilots were credited a victory as 'shared') in IJN Air Force, which based on the world traditional and orthodox standard the Royal Navy, the Royal Air Force (RAF) and the Armée de l'Air (ALA) adopted in World War I, until World War II. His flight hours were about 500 hours in June 1943.

Notes

References

Books
 - text in Japanese.
 - text in Japanese, few images.
 - text in Japanese, few images.
 - text in Japanese, a few images.
 - text in Japanese.
 - text in Japanese, with images.
 - text in Japanese, no images.
 - reprinted in paper backs of the first printed in June, 1976; text in Japanese, few images.
 - reprinted version, text in Japanese, a few images.

1919 births
2008 deaths
Japanese naval aviators
Japanese World War II flying aces
Imperial Japanese Navy officers
People from Hokkaido